or  (English: 3 Turks and a baby) is a 2015 German comedy film, written and directed by Sinan Akkuş. Starring the German rapper Eko Fresh and the actors Kida Khodr Ramadan and Kostja Ullmann, the film tells the story of the three Yildiz brothers Celal, Sami and Mesut, who live under one roof and lead a chaotic bachelor life. That changes suddenly, when a little baby comes into their lives that they have to take care of. In 2015  was nominated for the Civis Media Prize for Integration.

Plot
The three German-Turkish brothers Celal, Sami and Mesut are in their thirties and still live together in their parents' small apartment in Frankfurt am Main, running the inherited bridal fashion store without success. Womanizer Celal cannot get over the separation from his ex-girlfriend Anna and wants to open a mobile phone shop, but has gambled away their joint inheritance. Sami longs for a wife. However, his first dates often go down the drain because of his quickly budding rage. The youngest brother, Mesut, is a hopeless romantic and dreams of a career as a successful musician. However, this does not fit in with his recent decision, which is to adhere the rules of the Quran.

The brothers' situation worsens when they suddenly have to take care of Anna's baby when she is hospitalized. With help from Sami and Mesut, Celal tries to fulfill his duties as a surrogate father. After a chaotic start, the three brothers learn to take responsibility and to take on the busy duties of a father. They begin to enjoy the company of their little foster baby.

Cast
 Kostja Ullmann as Celal Yildiz
 Kida Khodr Ramadan as Sami Yildiz
 Eko Fresh as Mesut Yildiz
 Jytte-Merle Böhrnsen as Anna Kemper
 Baby Clara as Baby Nala
 Axel Stein as Gunnar Caro
 Frederick Lau as  Matthias
 Rainer Ewerrien as Sven
 Dagmar von Kurmin as Elena Krause
 Christoph Maria Herbst as Director of operations
 Bodo Bach as Neighbor
 Anna Böger as Laura
 Jacob Matschenz as Caspar
 Hans Sarpei as Balthasar
 Simon Desue as Man at the swimming pool
 Joyce Ilg as Woman at playground
 Julia Thurnau as Helgart
 Alexander Beyer as Holzapfel
 Stefan Lampadius as Pharmacist
 Jörg Schäfer as Boss
 Dieter Rupp as County Court bailiff
 Sinan Akkuş as Policeman
 Celo & Abdi as Car dealers
 Sabine Wackernagel as Doctor

Release
The German theatrical release took place on 22 January 2015. Netflix started streaming the film on 15 December 2016 in the United States for the first time, on 1. September 2018 in Germany and in several other countries.

Accolades
2015: Nomination for the Civis Media Prize in the category CIVIS European Cinema Prize

References

External links
 

2015 films
2015 comedy films
German comedy films
2010s German-language films
2010s German films